Kaman-Kalehöyük is a multi-period archaeological site in Kırşehir Province, Turkey, around 100 km south east of Ankara, 6 km east of the town center of Kaman. It is a tell or mound site that was occupied during the Bronze Age, Iron Age and Ottoman periods. The distance to Hattusa, the Hittite capital, is about 100km.

In 550 BC, Kırşehir and its region, along with the whole of Anatolia, came under Persian rule. Although no significant settlement remains and finds belonging to this period were found in Kırşehir, seals belonging to the Persian period were found in the Kaman Kale Höyük excavation. It is learned from the sources that there was a settlement named Zama here in ancient times. During the period of the Kingdom of Cappadocia, which was established in 333 BC, Kırşehir and its region were under intense pressure due to the lack of authority. In 18 AD, the Roman Emperor Tiberius officially annexed Cappadocia to Rome and made it a state. During the Roman period, the Kırşehir region spread rapidly in Christianity as well as paganism. In the Kaman region, there are remains of Byzantine buildings and the ruins of Ömerhacılı Castle. This indicates that there was a Byzantine settlement in the region.

"Dark Age" period 
According to the Japanese archaeologists,

 “In the levels belonging to the 2nd millennium B.C., a succession of cultural levels can be clearly seen, from the Assyrian Colony Period, Old Hittite Kingdom, and Hittite Empire Period.”

Then, from the 12th century onward after the Hittite Empire collapsed, it is generally believed that a "Dark Age" had occurred in Anatolia, during which there were no significant cultural developments. So this period is believed to have lasted until the 8th century. But the excavations of Stratum IId at Kaman-Kalehöyük that belonged to the early part of this period (Early Iron Age) showed that life and cultural developments continued on this site.

Stratification 

The following is adapted from Omura 2011, pp. 1099–1100.

I: Middle Ages (finds: hair brooches, 1 ceramic bowl, earrings and finger rings, stone lamp, coins, etc.)

Ia Ottoman period
Ib Byzantine period

II: Iron Age settlements finds: Fibulae and arrowheads, including some in Scythians style. Decorative plates made of animal bones, painted ceramics. In addition, Phrygian, Achaemenid and possibly one Elamite stamp seal were found.

 IIa1–2 Hellenistic period (Alexander the Great and later)
 IIa3–5 Late Iron Age (Lydian, Achaemenid)
 IIa6–IIc1 Middle Iron Age (Phrygian rule)
 IIc2–3 Middle Iron Age (Alişar IV)
 IId1–3 Early Iron Age (Dark Age )

III: Hittite period

 IIIa 15th ~ 12th century BC Hittite empire
 IIIb 17th ~ 15th century BC Old Hatti Empire
 IIIc 20th ~ 17th century BC Assyrian colonies

IV: Pre-Hittite period

 IVa Intermediate Period
 IVb Early Bronze Age

Metallurgy and glassware 
In 2005, metallurgical analysis by Hideo Akanuma of iron fragments found at Kaman-Kalehöyük in 1994 and dating to c. 1800 BCE revealed that some of these fragments were  composed of carbon steel; these currently form the world's earliest known evidence for steel manufacture.

Also recently, some of the oldest glass in the world has been found at Kaman. This glass is estimated to be 3600-year-old [1600 BC].

Kaman Kalehöyük Archaeological Museum 

Kaman Kalehöyük Archaeological Museum, which was made as a grant by the Japanese Government within the framework of the "Cultural Heritage Preservation Project", covers a total area of 1,500 square meters, 830 square meters of which is open and 470 square meters of which is enclosed. It is located near the site.

In the museum, there are exhibition halls, a cine-vision corner, a library, a laboratory, cafe, warehouses and technical sections that allow examination, research, photography and restoration work. 

The landscaping is arranged in the style of an excavated mound. Thus, the visitors were provided to see both the finds unearthed during the excavations and the excavation methods and works. Also, the largest botanical garden outside of Japan is built in a "Japanese garden" style. The museum received the "Best green museum" award in 2011 and was nominated for the Museum of the Year in Europe in 2012.

Buklukale 
The site of Büklükale is located in Kırıkkale province, central Turkey near the town of Karakeçili (coordinates 39° 35’ 0” N by 33° 25’ 42” E). It is about 50km west of Kaman-Kalehöyük. The site is about 500m by 650m wide.

The location of Büklükale is significant because it is situated at the narrowest point of Kızılırmak river that served as an important crossing-point through the ages. There is a Seljuk (13th century A.D.) bridge there, and the remains of a Roman bridge.

The Japanese archaeological team from the Japanese Institute of Anatolian Archaeology that excavate Kaman-Kalehöyük also conduct excavations here under the direction of K. Matsumura since 2008.

The site was settled since the Early Bronze Age period (the third millennium BC).

A fragment of a Hittite cuneiform tablet was found here during excavations in 2010. This is the most westerly find of any cuneiform tablet in Turkey to date.

References

Literature 
 Masao Mori, Sachhiro Omura: A Preliminary Report on the Excavations at Kaman-Kalehöyük in Turkey, in: P. Mikasa (Hrsg.): Essays on Ancient Anatolia and its surrounding Civilizations. Harrassowitz Verlag, Wiesbaden 1995.
 Masako Omura: Stamp Seals from Kaman-Kalehöyük dated from the 1st Millennium B.C., in: P. Mikasa (Hrsg.): Essays on Ancient Anatolia and its surrounding Civilizations. Harrassowitz Verlag, Wiesbaden 1995.
 Sachihiro Omura: Preliminary Report on the 22nd Excavation Season at Kaman-Kalehöyük in 2007. In: Anatolian Archaeological Studies 17, 2008, S. 1–43 PDF.
 Sachihiro Omura: Kaman-Kalehöyük Excavations in Central Anatolia. In: Sharon Steadman (Hrsg.): Oxford Handbook of Ancient Anatolia, Oxford University Press, Oxford 2011, S. 1099–1110.

External links

 Kaman-Kalehöyük at megalithic.co.uk
 Kaman Kalehöyük Archaeological Museum
 Kaman-Kalehöyük - Japanese Institute of Anatolian Archaeology

Archaeological sites in Central Anatolia
Former populated places in Turkey
Buildings and structures in Kırşehir Province